The 3V Movement (M3V), whose complete name is "Vaccines We Want Truth Movement", is an anti-vaccination party in Italy.

History
The 3V Movement was founded in January 2019, with the aim of politically representing all the anti-vaccination movements in the country; its president is Alessandra Bocchi, while its secretary is Luca Teodori. By 2020, the M3V took part in several regional elections, collecting only very poor successes: its best result was reached in the Venetian regional election with 0.7% of votes.

The 3V Movement slightly gained attention amid the COVID-19 vaccination campaign in Italy. In the Italian local elections of 3–4 October 2021, the M3V elected its mayoral candidates in the municipal councils of Rimini (Matteo Angelini, who got 4.1% of the votes) and Trieste (Ugo Rossi, who got 4.5% of the votes). On 21 September Ugo Rossi was arrested for insulting a public official and aggravated injuries for the attack on two Carabinieri during a dispute that broke out over a mask not worn by another candidate of the movement in a post office.

Electoral results

Regional Councils

References

External links 
Official website

2019 establishments in Italy
Political parties established in 2019
Single-issue parties in Italy
Anti-vaccination organizations